Morris High School Historic District is a national historic district centered on a  high school located at Morrisania, The Bronx, New York, New York.  The district includes 51 contributing buildings.  It includes the Morris High School, two streets of brick rowhouses, and Trinity Episcopal Church of Morrisania.  The high school and rowhouses were built between 1897 and 1904.  The church complex dates to the late-19th century, with the church started in 1874.

It was listed on the National Register of Historic Places in 1983.

References

External links
The Episcopal Diocese of New York website

Historic districts on the National Register of Historic Places in the Bronx
New York City designated historic districts
New York City Designated Landmarks in the Bronx
Morrisania, Bronx